Malik Barkat Ali (1 April 1886 – 5 April 1946) was an Indian Muslim politician, lawyer and journalist.

Early life and career
Malik Barkat Ali was born in April 1885 in Lahore a city of Punjab,  British India, to a Kakazai Pashtun family. After education at the local high school, he won a scholarship to the famous Forman Christian College, in Lahore. After graduating from there he remained an Assistant Professor at this college from 1905 to 1907 and then passed the LLB Law examination, and was selected as a Junior Magistrate in the Punjab Service in 1908, working there until 1914, when he resigned because he had developed differences on principles with the authorities there.

He practiced law full-time afterwards and also edited The Observer, an English daily newspaper from 1914 – 1918. This position of newspaper editor gained him prominence in Punjab politics.

Political career
Malik Barkat Ali joined the Punjab Provincial Muslim League in 1916, and was inspired by the Muslim nationalist ideas of Allama Muhammad Iqbal. For many years, he remained a staunch member of the League.  He was elected to the Punjab Legislative Assembly in 1937 for the Muslim League and alone represented the League in opposing the Unionist Party (Punjab) for 7 years in the assembly.

Bhagat Singh trial
In 1929, when Bhagat Singh was tried in Lahore, Allama Iqbal, Malik Barkat Ali, Nanka Chand and Norang jointly moved a resolution in the Lahore High Court's Bar condemning this trial. Malik Barkat Ali was a vigorous supporter of Allama Iqbal until Iqbal's death in 1938.

Pakistan Resolution
In March 1940, the now famous Lahore Resolution for the creation of Pakistan was approved under the leadership of Muhammad Ali Jinnah. Malik Barkat Ali also participated in that process as a member of All India Muslim League's Working Committee.

In his later years, however, he was very impressed by Syed Ata Ullah Shah Bukhari and he thus underwent a considerable change in his ideas, and joined the All India Majlis-e-Ahrar-ul-Islam. Barkat Ali also served as a secretary of the Anjuman-e-Himayat-e-Islam for some time.

Death and legacy
Malik Barkat Ali died on 5 April 1946, at Lahore while addressing a special tribunal in the Burma Fraud Case.
At a Special Session of the Muslim League held in 1946, the Quaid-i-Azam paid him the tribute saying:

Commemorative postage stamp
In 1990, Pakistan Post Office issued a commemorative postage stamp in his honour in its 'Pioneers of Freedom' series.

References

External links
Malik Barkat Ali at www.cybercity-online.net
 Malik Barkat Ali — a tribute

Indian male journalists
1946 deaths
1886 births
All India Muslim League members
20th-century Indian Muslims
People from British India
Forman Christian College alumni
Academic staff of the Forman Christian College
Journalists from Punjab, India
20th-century Indian journalists
Pakistan Movement activists